OUP-16 is a histamine agonist selective for the H4 subtype.

References  

Guanidines
Histamine agonists
Nitriles
Tetrahydrofurans
Imidazoles